Mannix (subtitled Themes from the Original Score of the Paramount Television Show) is an album featuring music composed and conducted by Lalo Schifrin which was recorded in 1968 and released on the Paramount label. As with Music from Mission: Impossible (1967) and More Mission: Impossible the music on this album is rerecorded and extended scores that were originally commissioned for the TV series Mannix.

Track listing
All compositions by Lalo Schifrin except as indicated
 "Mannix" - 2:29 
 "The Edge of Night" - 2:53 
 "The Girl Who Came in with the Tide" - 2:26 
 "Beyond the Shadow of Today" (Schifrin, Herb Geller) - 2:57 
 "The Shadow" - 3:03 
 "Turn Every Stone" (Shorty Rogers) - 2:59 
 "Hunt Down" - 2:20 
 'Warning: Live Blueberries" - 3:29 
 "Fear" - 2:39 
 "The End of the Rainbow" - 2:36 
 "Endgame" - 2:28 
Recorded in Los Angeles, California in October 1968

Personnel
Lalo Schifrin - arranger, conductor
Conte Candoli, Graham Young, John Audino, Bobby Bryant - trumpet, flugelhorn 
Lloyd Ulyate, Dick Nash, Milt Bernhart, George Roberts - trombone
Bud Shank, Ronny Lang, Plas Johnson, Jack Nimitz, Gene Cipriano - reeds
Mike Melvoin - piano, electric piano, organ
Tommy Tedesco, Howard Roberts - guitar 
Carol Kaye - guitar, electric bass
Max Bennett - bass
Larry Bunker, Ken Watson, Emil Richards, Francisco Aguabella, percussion
Robert Helfer - orchestra manager
Dick Hazard, Milt Rogers - arranger

References

Lalo Schifrin albums
1969 albums
Albums arranged by Lalo Schifrin
Paramount Records (1969) albums